The Curse of King Tut's Tomb is a 1980 horror film directed by Philip Leacock and starring Eva Marie Saint, Harry Andrews, Raymond Burr and Tom Baker, with Paul Scofield as the narrator.

Plot 
The English archaeologist Howard Carter and his financier, Lord Carnarvon discover the tomb of Tut-Ench-Amun after years of search. Unscrupulous art collector Sebastian is after the legendary sarcophagus from within the tomb. Rumors abound of a curse that befalls anyone who disturbs the grave. The Curse of the Pharaoh seems to be effective, for there ensues a series of mysterious deaths.

Cast 

Eva Marie Saint as Sarah Morrissey
Robin Ellis as Howard Carter
Raymond Burr as Jonash Sabastian
Harry Andrews as Lord Carnarvon
Wendy Hiller as Princess Vilma
Angharad Rees as Lady Evelyn Herbert
Tom Baker as Hasan
Barbara Murray as Giovanna Antoniella
Faith Brook as Lady Almina Carnarvon
Patricia Routledge as "Posh" Lady
John Palmer as Fishbait
Darien Angadi as Ahmed Nahas
Rupert Frazer as Collins
Rex Holdsworth as Doctor
Stefan Kalipha as Daoud
Andy Pantelidou as Lieutenant
Alfred Hoffman as Stallholder
Paul Scofield as Narrator (voice)

Production
The film was made-for-television by Columbia Pictures Television, with the story based on the book Behind the Mask of Tutankhamen by Barry Wynne. It is a fictionalised account of Howard Carter and Lord Carnarvon's excavation of Tutankhamun's tomb, with the real events embellished with various myths and legends. It was shot in Egypt and England.

The English actor Ian McShane was originally cast as Carter, but had to be replaced when he was involved in a car accident prior to filming and broke his leg.

Soundtrack 
The score was composed by American jazz musician Gil Mellé.

Release
It was released in two-parts and aired on 8 and 9 May 1980.

DVD release
A Region 2 DVD was released in 2011 by Network.

References

External links 

1980 films
1980 television films
1980 horror films
American horror television films
British horror television films
Films about archaeology
Films directed by Philip Leacock
Films shot in Egypt
Films shot in England
Films scored by Gil Mellé
Cultural depictions of Tutankhamun
1980s English-language films